The Donne Triptych (or Donne Altarpiece) is a hinged-triptych altarpiece by the Early Netherlandish painter Hans Memling. It consists of five individual panel paintings: a central inner panel, and two double-sided wings. It was painted for the soldier, courtier and diplomat Sir John Donne, probably sometime between the late 1470s or early 1480s, and contains portraits of Donne, his wife and daughter. It is kept in the collection of the National Gallery, London, with the panels still in their original frames.

When Donne commissioned the work is unknown. Art historians have debated whether it was painted in the early 1480s, around the same time Memling painted Virgin and Child with Saints Catherine of Alexandria and Barbara, in New York at the Metropolitan Museum of Art. An earlier date of sometime in the late 1470s is possible, at the time he completed the similar St John Altarpiece, or it may have been painted as a precursor to that altarpiece.

The donor, Sir John Donne of Kidwelly, was a Picardy-born Welsh diplomat for the House of York who visited Bruges at least once, in 1468 to attend Charles the Bold and Margaret of York's wedding; how he became acquainted with Memling is as uncertain as when he commissioned the triptych.

References

Sources

 Bauman, Guy. "Early Flemish Portraits 1425-1525". The Metropolitan Museum of Art Bulletin, New Series, volume 43, no. 4, 1986. 
 Blum, Shirley Neilson. Early Netherlandish Triptychs: A Study in Patronage. Los Angeles: University of California Press, 1969
 Bruce, Donald. Contemporary Review. Aug 94, Vol. 265 Issue 1543, p. 72.

1470s paintings
1480s paintings
Paintings by Hans Memling
Triptychs
Paintings of the Madonna and Child
Paintings of Saint Barbara
Paintings depicting John the Baptist
Sheep in art
Birds in art
Angels in art